is a railway station on the Aoimori Railway Line is a railway station in the city of Aomori in Aomori Prefecture, Japan, operated by the third sector railway operator Aoimori Railway Company.

Location
Koyanagi Station is served by the Aoimori Railway Line, and is 114.7 kilometers from the terminus of the line at Metoki Station.

Surrounding area
Koyanagi Elementary School

Station layout
Koyanagi Station has two unnumbered opposed side platforms, connected to the station building by a footbridge. The station is unattended.

Platforms

History
Koyanagi Station was opened on 1 November 1986 as a station on the Japan National Railways (JNR). With the privatization of the JNR on 1 April 1987, it came under the operational control of East Japan Railway Company (JR East). On 4 December 2010, the Tōhoku Shinkansen was successfully extended north to Shin-Aomori Station from Hachinohe. As a result of the opening of the bullet train between the two stations, that section of the Tōhoku Main Line including this station was transferred to the Aoimori Railway Company from JR East on the same day.

Services
Koyanagi Station is primarily served by trains operating on a local service on the Aoimori Railway Line between Aomori and Hachinohe. Passenger trains serve Koyanagi Station just over 17 hours a day from 5:51am to 11:42pm. At peak hours between the first train and 9:37am, trains depart from the station roughly every 30 minutes; otherwise trains depart at an approximate hourly basis. In 2018, a daily average of 1,085 passengers boarded trains at Koyanagi Station, an increase from the daily average of 559 passengers the station served in 2011, the first year of its operation on the Aoimori Railway Line. In 2018, the station was the seventh busiest on the Aoimori Railway Line, excluding Aomori and Hachinohe stations. It is the fourth busiest along the rail line in the city of Aomori.

Bus services
Koyanagi-Danchi bus stop
Aomori City Bus
For Aomori Station via Oka-Tsukurimishi or Minami-Tsukuda
For Tōbu-Eigyōsho via Harabetsu

See also
List of railway stations in Japan

References

External links

Railway stations in Aomori Prefecture
Aoimori Railway Line
Railway stations in Japan opened in 1986
Aomori (city)